There have been several sports events known as the Maghreb Championships, including:

Maghreb Athletics Championships, a defunct athletics competition
Maghreb Champions Cup, a defunct football competition
Maghreb Cup Winners Cup, a defunct football competition
Maghreb Cross Country Championships, a cross country running competition
Maghreb Judo Youth Championships, a judo competition for judoka aged under 18

See also
North African Championship, a former football competition between French Algeria, French Morocco and French Tunisia

Sport in North Africa